Sheldon Riley Hernandez (born 14 March 1999) is an Australian singer. He represented Australia in the Eurovision Song Contest 2022 with his song "Not the Same". He first appeared as a contestant on the eighth season of The X Factor Australia. Riley later competed on the seventh season of The Voice Australia, and in 2020, he appeared on America’s Got Talent for its fifteenth season.

Early life 
Riley was born in Sydney, New South Wales, to an Australian mother and a Filipino father. He grew up on the Gold Coast in Queensland.

Career

2016–2020: The X Factor, The Voice, and America's Got Talent 
In 2016, Riley, who then performed under his full name Sheldon Hernandez, auditioned for the eighth season of The X Factor Australia with the songs "Circle of Life" by Elton John and "Ordinary People" by John Legend. He originally participated in the 14–21s category, which was mentored by Adam Lambert, and was eliminated as a solo artist at the bootcamp stage of the competition. Riley returned to The X Factor after the mentor of the groups category, Iggy Azalea, selected him to be a part of a new boy band of eliminated solo artists. The band was called "Time and Place" and its members, in addition to Sheldon, included Sami Afuni, Matthew McNaught, and Leon Kroeber. The group was selected as one of Iggy Azalea's three acts, moving on to the live shows following the three-chair challenge. They were eliminated in the first week of the live shows.

In 2018, Riley appeared in the seventh season of The Voice Australia. He auditioned with the song "Do You Really Want to Hurt Me" by Culture Club. All of the four judges turned their chairs and Riley chose Boy George to be his coach. Riley made it to the final of the show and finished in third place.

Immediately following the final, Sheldon released "Fire" via Universal Music Australia.

In 2019, Riley returned to The Voice to compete in its eighth season as an all-star contestant. Riley auditioned with "Frozen" by Madonna and received chair turns from both eligible coaches. He chose Delta Goodrem as his coach. He was eliminated in the semi-final of the show.

In 2020, Riley competed in the fifteenth season of America's Got Talent. He auditioned with the song "Idontwannabeyouanymore" by Billie Eilish. He was eliminated in the third quarter-final of the season.

2021–present: Eurovision Song Contest, The Masked Singer 

On 26 November 2021, he was announced as one of the participants in the Eurovision – Australia Decides. Later, it was announced that his song for the contest was called "Not the Same", which released on 15 February 2022. He won the show with 100 points and therefore had the chance to represent Australia in the Eurovision Song Contest 2022 in Turin. Riley was one of the 10 qualifiers that advanced to the final of the competition on 14 May, where he reached 15th place with 125 points. Of the points he received, 123 were from national juries, and 2 points were from televoting.

In 2022, Riley took place in the fourth season of The Masked Singer as "Snapdragon" where he finished as runner-up. Riley later released a cover of "Never Enough", the song that he sang on the grand  final.

Personal life 
Riley is openly gay. He was diagnosed with Autism at age six. He currently lives in Melbourne.

Discography

Singles

References 

Living people
1999 births
21st-century Australian male singers
21st-century LGBT people
America's Got Talent contestants
Australia in the Eurovision Song Contest
Australian people of Filipino descent
Eurovision Song Contest entrants for Australia
Eurovision Song Contest entrants of 2022
Australian LGBT singers
People with Asperger syndrome
Gay musicians
Singers from Sydney
Musicians from Gold Coast, Queensland